Musea may refer to:

 Musea, a rare plural form of museum
 Musea, a Dallas-based zine created by Tom Hendricks
 Musea Records, a French progressive rock record label